Sarıkaya (“yellow-rock”, Also called Sarıcakaya,”yellowish rock”)) is a  village in Erdemli district of Mersin Province, Turkey. The village is situated in the southern slopes of  Toros Mountains and in summers it is used as a summer resort so called yayla. There are cedar forests around the village. The population of Sarıkaya  was 564 as of 2012 excluding summer settlers. The village was founded by a Turkmens tribe from Karaman in the 18th century. Initially, they had founded another village now called Yanıkköy (“burnt village”) ; but for reasons unknown, they had a clash with other Turkmens who had previously settled around and during the clashes Yanıkköy was burned down. Sarıcakaya was their next home. The main economic activity of the village is animal breeding. Fruits like cherry, apple and peach are also produced.

References

Villages in Erdemli District
Yaylas in Turkey